Pelargoderus rubropunctatus is a species of beetle belonging to Lamiini tribe of the longhorn beetle family, Cerambycidae, first described in 1831 by  Félix Édouard Guérin-Méneville as Lamia rubropunctatus.

Description

Distribution
This species can be found in Moluccas (Aru Islands, Kai Islands), New Guinea and Australia (Queensland).

References

 Biolib

External links
 Longicorn

rubropunctatus
Taxa named by Félix Édouard Guérin-Méneville
Beetles described in 1838